Manhood is a 2003 American comedy-drama film directed by Bobby Roth and starring Néstor Carbonell, John Ritter and Janeane Garofalo. It is a sequel to Jack the Dog (2001) and is also the final film starring Ritter to be released in his lifetime.

Plot
Jack (Carbonell) is a former womanizer and fashion photographer who is put in charge of his sister's 17-year-old-son when she leaves to find herself. During her leave, he attempts to revive his career while re-establishing a relationship with his nephew and son. In the midst of all this, Eli (Ritter), his sister's ex-husband moves in after he loses his job.

Cast
 Néstor Carbonell as Jack
 John Ritter as Eli
 Janeane Garofalo as Jill
 Bonnie Bedelia as Alice
 Nick Roth as Charlie
 Traci Lords as Actress

Awards and nominations
Ft. Lauderdale International Film Festival
Won, "Best American Indie" - Bobby Roth

References

External links
 
 

2003 films
2003 comedy-drama films
American comedy-drama films
Films directed by Bobby Roth
Films scored by Christopher Franke
2000s English-language films
2000s American films